The 3M11 Fleyta (flute, NATO reporting name AT-2 Swatter) is a Soviet MCLOS radio command anti-tank missile. Various improved versions were designated 9M17 Falanga

Development
The missile was developed by the Nudelman OKB-16 design bureau. It was developed at about the same time as the 3M6 Shmel as a heavy ATGM for use on both ground launchers and helicopters. It addressed some of the problems of the 3M6; it was much faster, and had slightly longer range. These improvements were achieved by sending commands via a radio link instead of a trailing guidance wire, which allowed the missile to travel faster. However, it did make it vulnerable to jamming. The missile system was shown to Soviet premier Nikita Khrushchev in September 1964, and accepted for service shortly afterwards.

History

The 3M11 was the first Soviet ATGM to be deployed from helicopters. Small numbers were fitted to the Mi-4AV. The missile was deployed on the Mil Mi-8 as well as the Mi-24 and Mi-25 series of helicopters. It was also deployed on the BRDM-1 and BRDM-2 infantry fighting vehicles.

The 3M11 Fleyta was problematic; one Russian source describes the missile as "notable for its complexity and low reliability". Also, the missile's range was felt to be inadequate. An improved version of the missile was developed: the 9M17 Falanga (NATO reporting name AT-2B). Externally, the missiles are very similar, however the 9M17 range is increased to 3.5 km. The standard production version was the 9M17M Falanga-M, which entered service in 1968.

The next development was to integrate SACLOS guidance, resulting in the 9M17P Falanga-P (NATO reporting name AT-2 Swatter-C). It entered service in 1969. A product improved version the 9M17MP was developed that had an improved engine and signal lamp.

The missile has been used extensively in the following wars on the Mi-24 platform.
 Angolan War of Independence
 Soviet invasion of Afghanistan
 1980s Iran–Iraq War
 1982 Lebanon War
 1973s Israel and Egypt War 6 October 

It was replaced in Soviet service by the 9K114 Shturm ATGM.

General characteristics (3M11 Fleyta) 

 Length: 1,160 mm
 Wingspan: 680 mm
 Diameter: 148 mm
 Launch weight: 27.0 kg
 Speed: 150–170 m/s
 Range: 500 m - 2.5 km
 Time to maximum range: 17 seconds
 Guidance: Radio command MCLOS
 Warhead: 5.4 kg HEAT 500 mm vs RHA；maximum 650 mm vs RHA for improved variant.

Models
 3M11 Fleyta MCLOS (NATO reporting name AT-2A Swatter A)

 9M17 Falanga (NATO reporting name AT-2B Swatter B): Range increased to 3.5 km.
 9M17DB Modified system to work with the Mi-8TB

 9M17M Falanga-M MCLOS: Launch weight , maximum range 3,500 m. First seen in the 1973 Moscow Parade.

 9M17P  Falanga-P (NATO reporting name AT-2C Swatter C): First SACLOS version.. Launch weight 29 kg.
 9M17MP Improved engine and guidance lamp. Maximum range 4,000 m.
 9M17N

Operators

Current operators

Former operators
 - passed on to successor states.

 – Used on Mi-24D, and subsequently passed on to the unified German state, and retired soon after.
 - Out of use since the 2003 invasion of Iraq.
 - only used on Mi-24D, withdrawn from service.
 - Missiles using as targets for training.

 - passed on to successor states.

Sources
 Hull, A.W., Markov, D.R., Zaloga, S.J. (1999). Soviet/Russian Armor and Artillery Design Practices 1945 to Present. Darlington Productions. .

References

External links

 AT - 2 SWATTER Anti-Tank Guided Missile

Anti-tank guided missiles of the Cold War
Anti-tank guided missiles of the Soviet Union
Military equipment introduced in the 1960s